Listed below are the rosters for the eight teams participating in the 1996 World Cup of Hockey.

Canada
Coaches

Players

Czech Republic
Players

Finland
Players

Germany
Players

Russia
Players

 Forward Pavel Bure (#96, Moscow, Russia, Vancouver Canucks) was injured during Russia vs USA Exhibition Game. He was replaced by Valeri Zelepukin.

Slovakia
Players

Sweden

Players

United States
Coaches

Players

References

Rosters
World Cup of Hockey rosters